Grant Shelby Hubley Jr., known as Whip Hubley, is an American actor.

Early life and education
Hubley was born in New York City, the son of Julia Kaul (née Paine) and Grant Shelby Hubley, an entrepreneur, oil investor, and writer. He attended the Buckley School for Boys in Upper East Side, Manhattan. As a resident of Montclair, New Jersey he attended Montclair Academy which then became part of Montclair Kimberley Academy, graduating in 1975. He is the brother of actress Season Hubley, also the former brother-in-law of Kurt Russell, and uncle of Season and Kurt's son, Boston Russell.

Career
He played the role of Mischa in the 1987 film Russkies, and Hollywood in the 1986 film Top Gun. Hubley said when he first read the script for Top Gun, he thought it would be an ensemble film but producers focused the story around Maverick when they "realized what they had with Tom." 

He later played Brian Hawkins in the Showtime miniseries More Tales of the City (1998) and its follow-up Further Tales of the City (2001). These miniseries were sequels to the PBS miniseries Tales of the City (1994), which starred Paul Gross in the role of Brian. From 1996 to 1999, Hubley had the lead role of Sheriff Tom Hampton on the revival of Flipper.

According to a 2022 interview with the Portland Press Herald, Hubley works as a manager for a construction firm in Southern Maine and acts in local theater productions.

Personal life
Hubley currently resides in South Portland, Maine, after spending over thirty years in Santa Monica, California. He is married to Dinah Minot, a former producer for Saturday Night Live and has three children, Molly, Ella and Ben. He met his wife while they were students at the University of Vermont. His wife is the sister of writer Susan Minot.

Filmography

 1985 St. Elmo's Fire as Raymond Slater
 1985 Magnum, P.I. (TV series) as Stu (1 episode)
"Round and Around" TV Episode (as Grant Hubley)
 1986 Firefighter (TV) as Lance
 1986 Club Life (1986) as Herb
 1986 North and South, Book II (TV miniseries) as Lieutenant Stephen Kent
 1986 Top Gun as Lieutenant Rick 'Hollywood' Neven
 1987 Russkies as Mischa
 1988 I'll Be Home for Christmas (TV)
 1989 Desperado: The Outlaw Wars (TV) as Charlie Cates
 1989 The Cover Girl and the Cop (TV)
 1989 Everybody's Baby: The Rescue of Jessica McClure (TV) as Robert O'Donnell
 1989 Nasty Boys (TV)
 1989 A Connecticut Yankee in King Arthur's Court (TV)
 1989-1991 Life Goes On (TV series) as Dr. Oliver Matthews
 1991 Wife, Mother, Murderer (TV) as Lieutenant Gary Carroll
 1992 Desire and Hell at Sunset Motel as Chester DeSoto
 1992 Devlin (TV) as Sam Lord
 1993 Lake Consequence (TV) as Jim
 1993 Coneheads as F-16 Pilot
 1993 Bounty Tracker as Ralston
 1994 Babylon 5 (TV series) "Signs and Portents" as Raider #1
 1994 Unveiled as Peter Masters
 1994 Dead at 21 (TV series) as Agent Winston
 1994 Someone Else's Child (TV) as Danny
 1995 Species as John Carey
 1994-1996 Murder, She Wrote (TV series) as Musician / Randy Jinks
 1996 Executive Decision as Sergeant Baker
 1995-2000 Flipper (TV series) as Tom Hampton
 1996 A Very Brady Sequel as Explorer / Dead Husband
 1996 Driven as Jason Schuyler
 1996 Daddy's Girl as Mark Springer
 1997 Black Scorpion II: Aftershock as Michael Russo
 1997 Profiler (TV series) as Drew Brenneman
 1998 The Secrets of My Heart as Parker
 1998 More Tales of the City (mini TV series) as Brian Hawkins
 1998 Mike Hammer, Private Eye (TV series) as Loolie / Julius Llewellyn Sterling
 2000 Practice (TV series) as Craig Hansen
 2000 The Fugitive (TV series) as Brian Collier
 2001 Fangs as Dr. John Winslow
 2001 The Division (TV series) as Scott Berwin
 2001 Charmed (TV series) as Detective
 2001 Further Tales of the City (mini TV series) as Brian Hawkins
 2001 The District (TV series) as Agent Harris
 2002 MDs (TV series) as Fetterhoff
 2003 CSI: Miami (TV series) as Nick Gordon
 2003 The Handler (TV series) as Detective Colman
 2004 A Cinderella Story as Sam's Dad
 2007 Brothel as Brian
 2007 Murder 101: College Can Be Murder (TV) as Stuart Evans
 2009 Homeland as Edward
 2013 Drones as Colonel Wallace

References

External links

American male film actors
American male television actors
Living people
Male actors from New Jersey
Male actors from New York City
Montclair Kimberley Academy alumni
People from Montclair, New Jersey
20th-century American male actors
21st-century American male actors
Year of birth missing (living people)